Oleg Velyky (Oleh Welykyj) (14 October 1977 – 23 January 2010) was a Ukrainian and German handball player. He was a World champion 2007 with the German national team (he was on the team roster, but did not play because of an injury).

Velyky was born in Brovary, Ukraine. He became a German citizen in April 2004. He participated on the German team which finished 4th at the 2008 European Men's Handball Championship.

Club player
Velyky won the EHF Cup in 2005 with the club TUSEM Essen and played for the Rhein-Neckar Löwn and HSV Handball.

Family
Velyky was married to Kataryna and had one son.

Health
He ruptured his cruciate ligament twice in 2006 and 2008, and sprained his foot in 2007. His health problems limited his international career to the World Championships in 2005 and one game in the 2008 European Championships.

In September 2003, he was diagnosed with a melanoma; it was in remission until the disease returned in March 2008, and caused his death in Kyiv, aged 32, in January 2010.

References

External links

1977 births
2010 deaths
People from Brovary
Deaths from cancer in Ukraine
Deaths from melanoma
Handball-Bundesliga players with retired numbers
Ukrainian male handball players
German male handball players
Naturalized citizens of Germany
Ukrainian emigrants to Germany
Sportspeople from Kyiv Oblast